South Durham, formally the Southern Division of Durham and often referred to as Durham Southern, was a county constituency of the House of Commons of the Parliament of the United Kingdom. It elected two Members of Parliament (MPs) by the bloc vote system of election.

History 
The constituency was created by the Great Reform Act for the 1832 general election, when the former Durham constituency was split into the northern and southern divisions, each electing two members using the bloc vote system. 

The seat was abolished by the Redistribution of Seats Act 1885 when the two divisions were replaced by eight single-member divisions. These were Barnard Castle, Bishop Auckland, Chester-le-Street, Houghton-le-Spring, Jarrow, Mid Durham, North West Durham and South East Durham.  In addition there were seven County Durham borough constituencies.

Boundaries 
1832–1885

 The Wards of Darlington and Stockton, with a place of election at Darlington. 

See map on Vision of Britain website.

From 1868, included non-resident 40 shilling freeholders in the parliamentary boroughs of Darlington, Stockton-on-Tees and The Hartlepools, which were created by the Reform Act 1867.

Members of Parliament

Election results

Elections in the 1830s

Elections in the 1840s

Elections in the 1850s

Elections in the 1860s

Elections in the 1870s

Elections in the 1880s

See also 
History of parliamentary constituencies and boundaries in Durham
List of former United Kingdom Parliament constituencies

References 

 Boundaries of Parliamentary Constituencies 1885-1972, compiled and edited by F.W.S. Craig (Parliamentary Reference Publications 1972)
 British Parliamentary Election Results 1832-1885, compiled and edited by F.W.S. Craig (Macmillan Press 1977)
 The Parliaments of England by Henry Stooks Smith (1st edition published in three volumes 1844–50), second edition edited (in one volume) by F.W.S. Craig (Political Reference Publications 1973)
 Who's Who of British Members of Parliament: Volume I 1832-1885, edited by M. Stenton (The Harvester Press 1976)
 Who's Who of British Members of Parliament, Volume II 1886-1918, edited by M. Stenton and S. Lees (Harvester Press 1978)

Parliamentary constituencies in County Durham (historic)
Constituencies of the Parliament of the United Kingdom established in 1832
Constituencies of the Parliament of the United Kingdom disestablished in 1885